The canton of Fontainebleau is a French administrative division, located in the arrondissement of Fontainebleau, in the Seine-et-Marne département (Île-de-France région).

Demographics

Composition 
At the French canton reorganisation which came into effect in March 2015, the canton was expanded from 7 to 34 communes:

Achères-la-Forêt
Amponville
Arbonne-la-Forêt
Avon
Barbizon
Boissy-aux-Cailles
Boulancourt
Bourron-Marlotte
Burcy
Buthiers
Cély
Chailly-en-Bière
La Chapelle-la-Reine
Fleury-en-Bière
Fontainebleau
Fromont
Guercheville
Héricy
Nanteau-sur-Essonne
Noisy-sur-École
Perthes
Recloses
Rumont
Saint-Germain-sur-École
Saint-Martin-en-Bière
Saint-Sauveur-sur-École
Samois-sur-Seine
Samoreau
Tousson
Ury
Le Vaudoué
Villiers-en-Bière
Villiers-sous-Grez
Vulaines-sur-Seine

See also
 Communes of the Seine-et-Marne department
 Cantons of the Seine-et-Marne department

References

Fontainebleau